The Bloch MB.110 was a mailplane designed and built in France in the early 1930s. It was a high-wing monoplane of all-metal construction.

Specifications

References

Bloch aircraft
Aircraft first flown in 1933